Omni Air International, LLC. is a United States charter airline headquartered in Hangar 19 on the grounds of Tulsa International Airport in Tulsa, Oklahoma, United States. It specializes in passenger charter flights, and Aircraft Crew Maintenance Insurance (ACMI) wet leasing. Omni is an FAA Part 121 certificated airline with IATA Operational Safety Audit (IOSA) registration.

History

The airline was established under the name Omni Air Express and started operations in March 1993 with a Boeing 727 freighter aircraft. In 1993, Omni started its Part 121 air carrier operations with Boeing 727F equipment in the narrow-body cargo market. Customers include integrated shipping companies such as BAX Global, DHL, Emery Worldwide and UPS.

In 1997 the company changed its name to Omni Air International and launched passenger operations with DC-10s (including N270AX, the last DC-10 ever built).

In 1998, the company sold its Boeing 727F fleet to focus exclusively on its growing passenger business. From 1998 to 2000 the company acquired three second-hand long-range  McDonnell Douglas DC-10-30s and began providing international charter service to wholesale companies, cruise lines, wet lease Aircraft, Crew, Maintenance and Insurance (ACMI) for other airlines and the US Department of Defense.

In April 2003, the Boeing 757-200 passenger aircraft was added to its fleet. The 757-200 fleet was approved for extended range over water operations (ETOPS). Boeing 767-300ER aircraft were added starting in August 2009, and Boeing 777-200ER aircraft began operating in April 2011. That same year the Boeing 767-200ER was added to the fleet.

In 2011, Omni retired the McDonnell Douglas DC-10s from the fleet and received its IATA Operational Safety Audit (IOSA) registration. In 2012 Omni retired the Boeing 757-200.

On October 2, 2018, Air Transport Services Group (ATSG) announced it would acquire Omni subject to regulatory approval. On November 9, 2018 Air Transport Services Group (ATSG) completed its $845 million acquisition of Omni.

In September 2019, Omni aided in the repatriation of British citizens after the collapse of the UK’s Thomas Cook Airlines. The airline was contracted by the Civil Aviation Authority under the instruction of the British government to operate rescue flights returning stranded Thomas Cook passengers to the UK.

In 2020, Omni Air obtained $67 million in coronavirus relief aid, as well as a $77.65 million contract with the Donald Trump administration's Department of Defense for "international charter airlift services."

In August 2021, U.S. President Joe Biden activated the Civil Reserve Air Fleet, utilizing 18 aircraft from six commercial airlines to ferry evacuees of Afghanistan from interim waystations throughout the Middle East and Europe. According to the Pentagon, the activation involves three aircraft each from American Airlines, Atlas Air, Delta Air Lines and Omni Air; two from Hawaiian Airlines; and four from United Airlines.

Fleet

As of January 2023, the Omni Air International fleet consists of the following aircraft:

Accidents and Incidents 
On 28 August 2020, an Omni Air International Boeing 767 (registered N423AX) operated a flight between Kabul, Afghanistan and Washington, United States with a scheduled refueling stop at Bucharest, Romania. During landing at the Romanian capital, the aircraft’s left-hand main landing gear collapsed. The aircraft continued to skid along the runway. Emergency slides were used to evacuate the 80 passengers from the aircraft without injury.

Controversies 
Omni Air International is one of the few airlines willing to cooperate with Immigration and Customs Enforcement (ICE) in controversial (sometimes termed "high-risk") deportations. The company has been characterized as engaging in price gouging over its role in deportation flights. For its role in deporting 163 people on 18 November 2019, Omni Air charged U.S. taxpayers $1.8 million.

References

External links

 

1993 establishments in Oklahoma
Airlines based in Oklahoma
Airlines established in 1993
American companies established in 1993
Charter airlines of the United States
Companies based in Tulsa, Oklahoma